Andrea Gorski (born May 16, 1970) is an American basketball coach who was the head women's basketball coach at Bradley University.

Playing career 
Gorski was a four-year point guard at Bradley, where she was a first-team all-conference selection as a senior, finishing her career in the top 10 of multiple career program records.

Coaching career 
Gorski began her coaching career as a graduate assistant at her alma mater Bradley in 1992. She left coaching for a job outside of basketball before returning as the head coach at Ladywood High School in Michigan. At Ladywood, she coached a team that won 11 district titles in 12 seasons and was also named the Michigan coach of the year in 2005 by the Associated Press.

Gorski was named the head coach at Concordia University Ann Arbor in 2008. She spent five seasons at Concordia, helping turn around a team that went sub-.500 the previous three seasons into a Wolverine–Hoosier Athletic Conference (WHAC) championship contender, making it to three NAIA tournaments and winning two WHAC coach of the year awards. Gorski left Concordia in 2013 to accept a position at Southern Illinois as their associate head coach, where her daughter Kiley committed to play basketball.

Bradley (second stint) 
Gorski was named the head coach at Bradley on April 9, 2016. She received a contract extension in 2019 after leading the Braves to their best season in a decade, while also helping develop three first-team All-MVC players, the same amount of Bradley players selected in the previous 15 years.

Gorski led Bradley to their first Missouri Valley Conference tournament championship in 2021, which also included a NCAA tournament bid, the first in Bradley program history.

Head coaching record

College

Personal life 
Gorski has two children, Luke and Kiley. Kiley was a basketball player who committed to Southern Illinois but did not play after suffering a career-ending injury. 

While coaching at Ladywood, Gorski was identified as the millionth fan to attend a Detroit Shock game, winning a prize package that included season tickets.

References

External links 
 
 Bradley profile

1970 births
Living people
People from Dearborn Heights, Michigan
Basketball players from Michigan
Basketball coaches from Michigan
Point guards
Bradley Braves women's basketball players
Bradley Braves women's basketball coaches
High school basketball coaches in Michigan
Southern Illinois Salukis women's basketball coaches